The Australian television series Swift and Shift Couriers, written and directed by Paul Fenech for SBS, aired from 27 October 2008 to 17 October 2011. The show consisted of 19 different episodes across two seasons.

Series Overview

Episodes

Season 1 (2008)

Season 2 (2011)

References

Lists of Australian comedy television series episodes